Cranium is a Swedish speed metal band formed in 1984. Cranium's music resembles German speed metal and thrash metal bands like Kreator, Sodom, and Destruction.

Members
Founding members
Philip von Segebaden (bass)
Gustaf von Segebaden (electric guitar)

Current members
Philip von Segebaden aka "Grave Raper" (bass)
Frederik Söderberg aka "Chainsaw Demon" (electric guitar, vocals)
Johan Hallberg aka "Necro Nudist" (drums, vocals)

Other contributors
Jocke Pettersson
Fredrik Engqvist

Discography
 Speed Metal Satan (EP) - 1997
 Speed Metal Slaughter - 1998
 Speed Metal Sentence - 1999

Musical groups established in 1984
Swedish heavy metal musical groups
Speed metal musical groups
Swedish musical trios